Kan Xuan (born in 1972 in Xuancheng, Anhui) is a Chinese contemporary visual artist, known for her experimental video artworks, though some of her work incorporates painting, photography, and performance art. She is considered as one of the most important female video artists of China, and has been active since the late 1990s.

Early life 
Kan was born in Xuancheng, Anhui Province. She studied from 1993 to 1997 at the China Academy of Art, in Hangzhou, where she was part of the evolution of video art from its inception in China. Two of her teachers were Geng Jianyi and Zhang Peili. During this time she became friends with video artists already renowned at the time, such as Zhang Peili. She moved to Shanghai after graduating from the China Academy of Art and then moved to Beijing in 1998. To maintain a living, Kan Xuan also did many other jobs such as sculpture assistant, and also worked at a movie production company. It was there she learned how to use the computer, video making, and 3D editing.

Career 
In 1998, she went to Beijing and worked for a sculpture factory and various film production companies. She participated in her first major group exhibition by showing her still frame video work "Kan Xuan! - Eh!" at the "Art for Sale" exhibition in 1999, which was one of the most innovative experimental art exhibitions to take place in China at the time.

Kan completed a residency at the Rijksakademie van Beeldende Kunsten in Amsterdam from 2002 to 2003. She received the Netherlands’ Prix de Rome in 2005. During her time in the Netherlands, she created works that focus on the concepts of liberation, globalization and its impact on economy. Much of her work examined the differences between China and the West, rich and poor, and effects of commercialization, which she explored in her 1999 work "Garbage" and 2006-2009 work "Island".

In 2009, she returned to Beijing, where she worked on large scale installations about Chinese history. She travelled extensively throughout China while making many short documentary films about important traditions that are often ignored in the present time.

A notable aspect of her work at exhibition "Yellow Signal: New Media in China" (2012) at The Vancouver International Centre for Contemporary Asian Art was an exploration of Zen spirituality.

Artistic style
Kan Xuan is often directly associated with the cool end of China's new media and video art. Yet opportunities to see her work, especially in Mainland China have been rare. Her first show in Beijing (2003), when her work Looking, Looking, Looking (2002) was included as a part of a touring exhibition named "Under Construction". In the next few years, some of her works were shown in and around 798.

Kan is often featured in her videos. She uses her personal experience as a way to convey the concepts of the works. Her early low-tech handheld camera-work brought an intimacy and beauty to seemingly trivial elements from everyday life. She quietly and humorously expresses immediate sensual experiences in unique visual angles, to an effect of sense altering and thought-provoking narratives. The artist's modest character is reflected through her work as a subtle, succinct nature; becoming a combination of understated visual components and a consciously slight choice of motifs brought to exploring profound ideas.

Kan often plays with ambiguity and dissonance. Although her works are often short and simple, they allude to a deeper sense of spiritualism.

In her own words, "it is about trying to become closer to and trying to follow, in every moment, my wish to exist in that distance between ‘thinking’ and ‘feeling’."

Personal life 
Currently, Kan divides her time between Beijing and Amsterdam.

Exhibitions 
Solo exhibitions
 2008: "Kan Xuan! Ai!." Galleria Continua (San Gimignano, Italy)
 2009: "Light, Works by Kan Xuan." Arrow Factory (Beijing)
 2012: "Kan Xuan: Millet Mounds." Ullens Center for Contemporary Art (Beijing)
 2016: "Kan Xuan" Ikon Gallery (Birmingham)

Selected group exhibitions
 1999: "Art for Sale" Modern Art Center (Shanghai)
 2000: "Home?, Contemporary Art Exhibition." Yuexing Furniture Plaza (Shanghai)
 2002: "The First Guangzhou Trienniale - Reinterpretation: A Decade of Experimental Chinese Art (1990-2000)." Guangdong Museum of Art (Guangzhou)
 2002: "Under Construction: New Dimensions of Asian Art." The Japan Foundation Asia Center; Tokyo Opera City Cultural Foundation
 2003: "Alors la Chine?" Centre Pompidou, Paris
 2004: "Dial 62761232 (Express Delivery Exhibition), Contemporary Art Exhibition." BizArt, Shanghai
 2005: "The Second Guangzhou Triennial, BEYOND: an extraordinary space of experimentation for modernization." Guangdong Museum of Art, Guangzhou
 2006: "9th Havana Biennial." National Art Center, Havana, Cuba
 2006: "Nunca salgo sin mi cámara / Never Go Out Without My DVcam, Video en china." Museo Colecciones ICO, Madrid, Spain
 2006: "China Power Station: Part I." Battersea Power Station (London)
 2007: "China Power Station: Part II." Astrup Fearnley Museum of Modern Art, Oslo, Norway
 2007: "China Power Station: Part III." National Art Museum, Luxembourg
 2007: "Not only Possible, But also Necessary-Optimism in the Age of Global War." 10th International Istanbul Biennial
 2007: "Everyday Miracles: Four Women Artists" at The Chinese Pavilion. 52nd Venice Biennale
 2008: "Our Future, The Guy & Myriam Ullens Foundation Collection." Ullens Center for Contemporary Art, Beijing
 2009: "Bourgeoisified Proletariat, Contemporary Art Exhibition in Songjiang." Shanghai Songjiang Creative Studio
 2010: "Jungle: A Close-Up Focus on Chinese Contemporary Art Trends." Platform China, Beijing
 2010: “Kan Xuan: Qingxie de Jiashi” (Kan Xuan: Oblique Housework)." National Art Museum of China, Beijing
 2012: "The Unseen - 4th Guangzhou Triennial." The Guangdong Museum of Art
 2013: "The Garden of Diversion, Sifang Art Museum Inaugural Exhibition." Sifang Art Museum, Nanjing
 2014: "The 8 of Paths, Art Exhibition in the Uferhallen." Uferhallen, Berlin
 2015: "Mobile M+: Moving Images." M+ (Hong Kong)
 2015: "China 8: Contemporary Art from China at the Rhine and Ruhr." Lehmbruck Museum, Duisburg
 2016: "Tales of Our Time." Solomon R. Guggenheim Museum (New York, U.S.A.)

Private collections
 Dr. Michael I. Jacobs Collection, U.S.A.
 M+ Collection, Hong Kong

Honors 
 2005: Prix de Rome, Netherlands

Selected works and publications 
  Special issue of Fused Magazine published to accompany the Serpentine Gallery exhibition at Battersea Power Station, 8 Oct. - 5 Nov. 2006
  Catalog of an exhibition held at Astrup Fearnley Museum of Modern Art, Oslo, Sept. 8-Dec. 2, 2007
  Catalogue of an exhibition held at Galleria Continua (Beijing), 12 July 2008
  Published on the occasion of the exhibition Kan Xuan: Millet Mounds at the Ullens Center for Contemporary Art, 2012.09.15-2012.11.15
  Published on the occasion of the exhibition held at Ikon Gallery, Birmingham, July 6-September 11, 2016
  Published on the occasion of the exhibition Tales of Our Time at the Solomon R. Guggenheim Museum, November 4, 2016 - March 10, 2017

References

External links 
 KAN XUAN 阚萱 at ShanghART Gallery

1972 births
Living people
20th-century Chinese women artists
21st-century Chinese women artists
Artists from Anhui
China Academy of Art alumni
Chinese contemporary artists
Chinese multimedia artists
People from Xuancheng
Prix de Rome (Netherlands) winners